Marion Hellmann (née Goldkamp; born 6 April 1967 in Linnich, Nordrhein-Westfalen) is a retired German high jumper, who competed for her native country at the 1992 Summer Olympics.

She finished fifth at the 1992 European Indoor Championships, twelfth at the 1993 World Indoor Championships and tenth at the 1994 European Indoor Championships.

Her personal best jump was 1.94 metres, achieved in May 1992 in Ahlen.

References

External links
sports-reference

1967 births
Living people
German female high jumpers
Athletes (track and field) at the 1992 Summer Olympics
Olympic athletes of Germany
Sportspeople from Cologne (region)
People from Düren (district)